Alje Schut (born 18 February 1981) is a Dutch former professional footballer who played as a defender for FC Utrecht, Mamelodi Sundowns and Kozakken Boys.

Career
Born in Utrecht, Schut began his career with hometown club FC Utrecht, making his professional debut on 3 October 1999.

In 2004 he spent seven months injured following a bacterial infection in his knee. In March 2005 he suffered another knee injury, ending his season. He was still suffering from that same injury in January 2006; at that time he was expected to return to fitness in April 2006.

He suffered further injuries, and only played 51 league between 2005 and March 2010.

On 10 May 2011, during a training session with his team, Schut collided with his Romanian teammate Mihai Neșu breaking his cervical vertebrae and leaving Neșu paralyzed from the waist down.

In August 2011, after spending thirteen seasons with FC Utrecht, Schut was the longer-serving player of any club in the Eredivisie.

By October 2011 Schut was the club captain of FC Utrecht.

Personal life
In February 2015 Schut stated his desire to become a primary school teacher after retirement.

Honours
Utrecht
KNVB Cup: 2002–03, 2003–04
Johan Cruyff Shield: 2004

References

1981 births
Living people
Footballers from Utrecht (city)
Dutch footballers
Association football defenders
FC Utrecht players
Mamelodi Sundowns F.C. players
Kozakken Boys players
Eredivisie players
South African Premier Division players
Derde Divisie players
Netherlands youth international footballers
Netherlands under-21 international footballers
FC Utrecht non-playing staff
Dutch expatriate footballers
Dutch expatriate sportspeople in South Africa
Expatriate soccer players in South Africa